

Hans von Greiffenberg (12 October 1893 – 30 June 1951) was a general in the army of Nazi Germany during World War II. He was a recipient of the Knight's Cross of the Iron Cross.

Awards and decorations

 Knight's Cross of the Iron Cross on 18 May 1941 as Generalmajor and chief of the general staff of the 12. Armee

References

Citations

Bibliography

 

1893 births
1951 deaths
People from Bytów County
People from the Province of Pomerania
German Army generals of World War II
Generals of Infantry (Wehrmacht)
German Army personnel of World War I
Prussian Army personnel
Recipients of the clasp to the Iron Cross, 1st class
Recipients of the Knight's Cross of the Iron Cross
German prisoners of war in World War II held by the United States
Reichswehr personnel